Aliabad-e Motalleb Khan (also Romanized as ‘Alīābād-e Moţalleb Khān and ‘Alīābād-e Moţleb Khān; also known as ‘Alīābād) is a village in Qohab-e Sarsar Rural District, Amirabad District, Damghan County, Semnan Province, Iran. At the 2006 census, its population was 81, in 27 families.

References 

Populated places in Damghan County